Jocelyn de Angulo, 1st Baron of Navan (fl. 1172), was an Anglo-Norman knight.

Biography
De Angulo was one of fifty knights serving under Hugh de Lacy upon the latter's grant of the Lordship of Meath by King Henry II of England in 1172. Jocelyn was awarded the title Baron of Navan by de Lacy. He had sons Gilbert, Philip and William, all of whom would be outlawed for rebellion in 1195. He built a fort at Navan, the origin of the town, of which he can be called the founder.

Jocelyn is believed to have derived his surname from his homeplace of Angle, Pembrokeshire.

Philip de Angulo
Philip was an Anglo-Irish knight, fl. 1195–1206, son of Jocelyn de Angulo of Meath, Philip and his two brothers, Gilbert and William, were outlawed for rebellion in 1195 and had their lands confiscated. However, in 1206 King John of England pardoned them, Philip being allowed to inherit his father's estates at Navan. From his brother, William de Angulo, descend the Connacht families of Waldron, and others. He is considered an ancestor of Nano Nagle.

William de Angulo
William was an Anglo-Irish knight, fl. 1195–1206, and son of Jocelyn de Angulo. William was associated with the rebellion of his brothers Gilbert and Philip in 1195, and likewise pardoned in 1206. He held lands in Meath under Walter de Lacy which were returned to him upon his pardon. He is the ancestor of the Mac Jordan Duff, Mac Phillip, de Bhaldraithe/Mac Bhaldrin/Waldron clans of County Mayo.

Clann Coisdealbhaigh (after Mac Fhirbhisigh)

Genealogical tree

Literary reference
The Song of Dermot and the Earl (composed early 13th century) mentions the de Angulo family, and casts doubt upon Gilbert's paternity. This is probably intended to insult Gilbert as a traitor to the King.

References

Knox, Hubert Thomas (1908) The History of the County of Mayo to the Close of the Sixteenth Century; with illustrations and three maps. Dublin: Hodges Figgis (reprinted by De Burca Rare Books, 1982 )

Anglo-Normans
Normans in Ireland
12th-century births
12th-century deaths
13th-century deaths
People from Pembrokeshire
People from County Meath